Central South University of Forestry and Technology (CSUFT) is a university located in Changsha, Hunan, China. The university covers a total area of 2,230 mu, with more than 101.3 square meters of floor space.

As of fall 2013, the university has 3 campuses, a combined student body of 41,000 students, 2,510 faculty members.

The university consists of 22 colleges, with 69 specialties for undergraduates, 97 specialties for master's degree candidates and 44 specialties for Doctoral candidates. At present, the university has 7 research institutions and research centres, including 4 national engineering research centres, 3 key national discipline, 1 national key laboratory.

History
Central South University of Forestry and Technology was founded in 1958, it was initially called "Hunan Academy of Forestry".

In November 2001, Hunan School of Forestry and Hunan Forestry Industrial School merged into Hunan Academy of Forestry.

In December 2005, it was renamed "Central South University of Forestry and Technology".

Academics
 School of Forestry
 School of Life Science and Technology
 School of Material Science and Engineering
 School of Physical Distribution
 School of Mechanic and Electronic Engineering
 School of Environmentand Design
 School of Furniture and Art Design
 School of Computer and Information Engineering
 School of Civil Engineering and Mechanics 
 School of Business
 School of Foreign Languages  
 School of Tourism
 School of Food Science and Engineering
 School of Science
 School of Political Science and Law
 School of Economics
 School of Physical Education 
 School of Music
 School of Ideology and Politics
 School of International Studies
 School of Continuing Education
 School of Concerning Foreign

Rankings and reputation 
As of 2021, the Central South University of Forestry and Technology was ranked 780th by SCImago Institutions Rankings. The Best Chinese Universities Ranking, also known as the "Shanghai Ranking", placed the university 210th in China out of 582 universities including in the ranking.

Central South University of Forestry and Technology was ranked # 1429 globally, 448th in Asia and 166th in China in the 2022 Best Global Universities by the U.S. News & World Report Best Global University Ranking. The university ranked 1650th in the world and 245th in China by the Center for World University Rankings 2022/23. The university ranked # 1328 in the world out of nearly 30,000 universities worldwide by the University Rankings by Academic Performance 2021-2022.

Library collections
Central South University of Forestry and Technology's total collection amounts to more than 2.7734 million items.

Culture
 Motto:

People

Notable alumni
 Wen Jianping
 Zhu Guangyao
 Li Qiangmin
 Liu Yuchun
 Huang Cheng
 Bai Fangmin
 Luo Yi
 Wu Yiqiang
 Cai Jingfeng
 Liu Jun
 Hong Jiayi
 Tan Zhongwen
 Liu Huimin
 Li Feng
 Hua Zhou
 Zhao Donghua
 Peng Changhui
 Hu Zhongxiong

References

External links

Universities and colleges in Hunan
Educational institutions established in 1958
Education in Changsha
Forestry education
Forestry in China
1958 establishments in China
Universities and colleges in Changsha